Orkesta Mendoza is a Latin music band from Tucson, Arizona. It was founded by singer and guitarist Sergio Mendoza in 2009. Through the use of Latin percussion, accordion, brass, and steel guitars, the band's style, dubbed "indie mambo", is a combination of ranchera, cumbia, psychedelic and indie rock.

Biography 
Sergio Mendoza formed Sergio Mendoza y La Orkesta in 2009 out of a one-off tribute project to the Cuban mambo king Pérez Prado, which proved too much fun to stop. Later renamed the band's name to Orkesta Mendoza.

In October, 2014, Orkesta Mendoza performed at WOMEX 14 Official Showcase Selection of World Music Expo 2014.

In May, 2015, Orkesta Mendoza performed at Pachanga Latino Music Festival.

Discography 
 Mambo Mexicano (2012)
 La Rienda (2014)
 ¡Vamos A Guarachar! (2016)
 La Caminadora (2018)
 Curandero (2020)

Members 
 Sergio Mendoza – vocals, piano, guitar
 James Anthony Peters – drums, percussion, sequencing
 Quetzal Guerrero - violin, vocals
 Raul Marquez - trumpet, guitar, vocals
Guest touring Members
 Brian Lopez - guitar, vocals

Former members
 Salvador Duran - Vocals
 Marco Rosano – saxophone, clarinet, accordion, keyboard Trombone
 Sean Rogers – double bass

References

External links 
 Official website of Sergio Mendoza Y La Orkesta
 Sergio Mendoza Y La Orkesta on Facebook

Musical groups from Tucson, Arizona
American Latin musical groups